Erick Mauricio Rodríguez Gavarrete (born 23 February 1968 in Tegucigalpa) is a Honduran lawyer and politician. He currently serves as deputy of the National Congress of Honduras representing the Liberal Party of Honduras for Lempira.

References

1968 births
Living people
People from Tegucigalpa
20th-century Honduran lawyers
Deputies of the National Congress of Honduras
Liberal Party of Honduras politicians
21st-century Honduran lawyers